Narora Atomic Power Station (NAPS) is a nuclear power plant located in Narora, Dibai Tehsil, Bulandshahar District in Uttar Pradesh, India.

Reactors 

The plant houses two reactors, each a pressurized heavy-water reactor (PHWR) capable of producing 220 MW of electricity. Commercial operation of NAPS-1 began on 1 January 1991, NAPS-2 on 1 July 1992.

The reactors were not originally under IAEA safeguards. but subsequent to the signing of the 1-2-3 agreement, they have been placed under IAEA monitoring   with effect from 2014

Units

Incidents 

31 May 1993 after  months of operation two steam turbine blades in NAPS-1 malfunctioned causing a major fire. This in combination with problems in the reactor's cabling system nearly led to a nuclear meltdown.

References

Nuclear power stations in Uttar Pradesh
Bulandshahr district
1991 establishments in Uttar Pradesh